Física o Química: El reencuentro (also FoQ: El reencuentro) is a two-part Spanish streaming television miniseries that originally aired on Atresplayer Premium from 27 December 2020 to 3 January 2021. It is a sequel to the teen drama series Física o Química (2008–2011), focusing on the lives of the original characters a decade after as they meet up again for the wedding of Yoli.

Synopsis 
Nine years after the closure of the Zurbarán institute, a large part of the group of friends meet again at a very important event: Yoli's wedding. In the hotel where the ceremony takes place, they will look back fondly on their best and worst moments and, at the same time, realize that the passage of time may not have wreaked havoc on their past relationships. All of them hide great secrets that none of their friends know what it is.

Cast

Protagonists 
 Andrea Duro as Yolanda "Yoli" Freire Caballar
 Maxi Iglesias as César Cabano de Vera
 Gonzalo Ramos as Julio de la Torre Reig
 Leonor Martín as Covadonga "Cova" Ariste Espinel
  Angy Fernández as Paula Blasco Prieto
 Adam Jezierski as Gorka Martínez Mora  
 Javier Calvo as Fernando "Fer" Redondo Ruano 
 Adrián Rodríguez as David Ferrán Quintanilla
 Sandra Blázquez as Alma Núñez Fontevilla
 Andrés Cheung as Jan Taeming

Main Cast 
 Ana Milán as Olimpia Díaz Centeno
 Blanca Romero as Irene Calvo Azpeolea
 Marc Clotet as Vicente Vaquero Castiñeira
 José Lamuño as Oriol Puig
 Álex Barahona as Alberto "Berto" Freire Caballar

Participations 
 Javier Ambrossi as himself
 Manuel Feijóo as Judge
 Despistaos as themselves

Production and release 
Writing duties were tasked to  Carlos García Miranda, whereas the two episodes were directed by Juanma Pachón. Filming of the two episodes began on 7 September 2020 and had already wrapped by the end of the month.

Some notable characters from the original series who failed to made an onscreen appearance include Ruth (Úrsula Corberó) and Blanca (Cecilia Freire).

Atresplayer Premium released the first episode (titled "Cosas que hacer antes de casarse") on 27 December 2020. The closing episode (titled "Sí, puedes volver atrás") aired on 3 January 2021.

Controversy 
The series arrived on the platform with a great controversy since Carlos Montero, one of the creators of the original fiction, was not taken into account to take charge of this sequel. "The creator of the series has not been asked, total ... what will he have to say?", The writer wrote on his Twitter profile on 22 April 2020, after hearing the news that Antena 3's fiction was returning in the form of a special to the Atresmedia platform.

At the fiction presentation round, held on 17 December. 2020, Montse García, fiction director of Atresmedia TV, assured that Montero could not be in the project due to "exclusivity contract issues" with Netflix , a platform to which he joined after the success of another of his creations, Elite. Days before, the creator of the series had already denied this information during the presentation of their latest project for the North American streaming service: "I think they have been asked and talked about my current contract with Netflix, but I have not talked to anyone about my contract and they don't know what contract I have. Netflix would not have prevented me from going back to 'Física o Química  to do two chapters".

After the premiere of this sequel, Montero criticized that his name had not been included in the credits of this special season that has served as a reunion to the characters he had created. After his complaint, those responsible for the revival have rectified and in his last episode credited the author as the creator of the characters.

Episodes

References 

2020s Spanish drama television series
2020 Spanish television series debuts
2021 Spanish television series endings
Spanish-language television shows
Atresplayer Premium original programming
Television series by Buendía Estudios
Spanish television miniseries
Sequel television series